Den Haag Mariahoeve is a railway station on the border of The Hague and Leidschendam-Voorburg in the Netherlands. The railway station, which opened on 22 May 1966, has two side platforms and an island platform. The rail connections between Den Haag Centraal and Schiphol and between Den Haag Centraal and Haarlem halt at Den Haag Mariahoeve.

Train services
The following services call at Den Haag Mariahoeve:
2x per hour local service (sprinter) The Hague - Leiden - Schiphol - Duivendrecht - Hilversum - Utrecht
2x per hour local service (sprinter) The Hague - Leiden - Haarlem

References

External links
NS website
Dutch Public Transport journey planner

Mariahoeve
Railway stations opened in 1966
Railway stations on the Oude Lijn
Leidschendam-Voorburg